Roblería del Cobre de Loncha National Reserve is a national reserve in Chile.

References

National reserves of Chile
Protected areas of Santiago Metropolitan Region